Tactusa parasumatrensis is a moth of the family Erebidae first described by Michael Fibiger in 2010. It is known from northern Sumatra in Indonesia.

The wingspan is about 12 mm. The ground colour of the forewing is greyish yellow. All crosslines are present, except the basal line. The hindwing is dark grey, with an indistinct discal spot and the underside is unicolorous grey.

References

Micronoctuini
Taxa named by Michael Fibiger
Moths described in 2010